Ian Maddocks (born 12 April 1951) is an Australian former cricketer. He played 22 first-class cricket matches for Victoria between 1977 and 1982.

See also
 List of Victoria first-class cricketers

References

External links
 

1951 births
Living people
Australian cricketers
Victoria cricketers
Cricketers from Melbourne